The Banbridge, Lisburn and Belfast Junction Railway was an Irish gauge railway in Ireland linking Belfast with Banbridge, County Down. It was built in the 19th century. The line between Knockmore and Banbridge was closed in 1956.

History
The Banbridge, Lisburn and Belfast Junction Railway (BLB) through Dromore opened in 1863. In 1876 the Ulster Railway became part of the new Great Northern Railway, which took over the BLB company in 1877. In 1953 the railway was nationalised as the GNR Board, which closed the line through Dromore on 29 April 1956.

The main engineering feature on the line was Dromore Viaduct.

Gallery

References

Bibliography

Closed railways in Ireland
Railway lines opened in 1863
Closed railways in Northern Ireland
Transport in Belfast
Transport in County Down
Defunct railway companies of Ireland
Irish gauge railways
Railway lines closed in 1956
1863 establishments in Ireland
1956 disestablishments in Northern Ireland
Defunct transport companies of Northern Ireland